Ardakul (also Romanized as Ardakūl, Ardekūl, and Ardakool; also known as Adkalā, Ardehkūl, and Qalat Atkhul) is a village in Zirkuh Rural District, Central District, Zirkuh County, South Khorasan Province, Iran. At the 2006 census, its population was 445, in 126 families.

References 

Populated places in Zirkuh County